Bayavü Hill Ward is a ward located under Nagaland's capital city, Kohima. The ward falls under the designated Ward No. 2 of the Kohima Municipal Council and is sub-divided into Upper Bayavü Hill and Lower Bayavü Hill.

Attractions
Nagaland State Museum

The Nagaland State Museum located in Bayavü Hill Ward and displays a comprehensive collection of artefacts including ancient sculptures, traditional dresses, inscriptions of the Naga people.

Education
Educational Institutions in Bayavü Ward:

Schools 
 Bayavü Higher Secondary School
 Bayavü Government Middle School
 Grace Higher Secondary School
 Vinyüzo School

See also
 Municipal Wards of Kohima

External links
 Map of Kohima Ward No. 2

References

Kohima
Wards of Kohima